Meta Platforms, formerly Facebook, Inc., has been involved in multiple lawsuits since its founding in 2004.

2000s

2010s

2020s

See also 
Facebook history
Criticism of Facebook
Europe v Facebook
Issues involving social networking services

References 

Meta Platforms